Dutch War may refer to:

Dutch–Portuguese War, 1588–1661
 Any of the four Anglo-Dutch Wars:
 First Anglo-Dutch War, 1652–54
 Second Anglo-Dutch War, 1665–67
 Third Anglo-Dutch War, 1672–74
 Fourth Anglo-Dutch War, 1780–84
  Franco-Dutch War, 1672–78, of which the Third Anglo-Dutch War was a part
Indonesian National Revolution
Travancore–Dutch War, 1739–1741